Southern Cloud USD 334 is a public unified school district headquartered in Miltonvale, Kansas, United States.  The district includes the communities of Miltonvale, Glasco, and nearby rural areas.

Schools
The school district operates the following schools:
 Glasco High School
 Miltonvale High School
 Glasco Grade School
 Miltonvale Grade School

See also
 Kansas State Department of Education
 Kansas State High School Activities Association
 List of high schools in Kansas
 List of unified school districts in Kansas

References

External links
 

School districts in Kansas